Two-time defending champion Shingo Kunieda and his partner Robin Ammerlaan defeated Stefan Olsson and Maikel Scheffers in the final, 7–5, 6–1 to win the men's doubles wheelchair tennis title at the 2009 Australian Open.

Kunieda and Satoshi Saida were the reigning champions, but Saida did not participate this year.

Seeds

  Stéphane Houdet /  Michaël Jérémiasz (semifinals)
  Robin Ammerlaan /  Shingo Kunieda (champions)

Draw

Finals

Wheelchair Men's Doubles
2009 Men's Doubles